Deandre Lamar Baker (born September 4, 1997) is an American football cornerback who is a free agent. He played college football at Georgia and was drafted by the New York Giants in the first round of the 2019 NFL Draft. Baker only played a single season with the Giants before being released by them due to charges of armed robbery, which were later dropped. He has also been a member of the Kansas City Chiefs.

High school career
During his time at Miami Northwestern Senior High School, Baker was an All-American Sprinter and participated in the 4 × 100 metres relay on the second leg.

College career
Baker signed with Georgia on national signing day, despite speculation that he would sign with Texas based on a tweet he sent out the night before. As a true freshman at Georgia in 2015, Baker played in 11 games. During the 2016 season, Baker was injured in a game against Vanderbilt. He recovered, but was later injured against Georgia Tech. Following the 2017 season, Baker was named to the Second-team All-SEC. Baker considered declaring for the 2018 NFL draft, but he ultimately elected to return to school for his senior year.

Baker was one of the best defensive backs in college football in his senior season. He allowed only 175 yards and a 40.2 NFL passer rating to opposing receivers in 2018, which both ranked in the top 5 of all draft eligible cornerbacks with a minimum of 300 coverage snaps. He was named a consensus 2018 All-American and won the Jim Thorpe Award, awarded to the best defensive back in college football. Over his entire 4-year tenure at Georgia, Baker only allowed one touchdown. Baker entered the 2019 NFL Draft as one of the best defensive back prospects.

Professional career

New York Giants

Baker was selected by the New York Giants in the first round, 30th overall, of the 2019 NFL Draft. The Giants had traded up with the Seattle Seahawks to acquire the pick giving up their 37th, 132nd and 142nd picks.

Baker was placed on the commissioner's exempt list on July 27, 2020, following his May 2020 arrest. The Giants waived Baker on September 8, 2020.

Kansas City Chiefs
On November 19, 2020, Baker was signed to the Kansas City Chiefs' practice squad. He was elevated to the active roster on December 19, December 26, and January 2, 2021, for the team's weeks 15, 16, and 17 games against the New Orleans Saints, Atlanta Falcons, and Los Angeles Chargers, and reverted to the practice squad after each game. Against the Chargers, Baker broke his femur on a non-contact play, becoming only the second NFL player to suffer a broken femur during a game. During the game, Baker recorded his first career sack on Justin Herbert. He was placed on the practice squad/injured list on January 12, 2021.

On February 9, 2021, Baker re-signed with the Chiefs. He was waived on August 7, 2022.

NFL career statistics

Personal life
On May 14, 2020, a warrant was issued for Baker's arrest under charges of armed robbery and aggravated assault with a firearm, along with Quinton Dunbar of the Seattle Seahawks. The following day, Baker's lawyer issued a statement claiming that he was in possession of multiple affidavits allegedly exonerating his client. The two allegedly robbed guests at gunpoint during a house party and had turned themselves in to the police by May 16. On August 7, 2020, Baker was charged with four counts of robbery with a firearm. There was evidence suggesting the alleged victims accepted $55,000 in exchange for changing their story in regards to Dunbar. On November 16, 2020, the charges against Baker were dropped.

References

External links

 College stats at Sports-Reference.com
 New York Giants bio
 Georgia Bulldogs bio

1997 births
Living people
Miami Northwestern Senior High School alumni
Players of American football from Miami
American football cornerbacks
Georgia Bulldogs football players
All-American college football players
New York Giants players
Kansas City Chiefs players